Subroto Cup International Football Tournament is a prestigious international inter-school football tournament that is held annually in New Delhi, India. The tournament held annually since 1960, is named after the Indian Air Force Air Marshal Subroto Mukerjee. It is the oldest national school football tournament in India and was instituted to promote and encourage the sport at the grassroots level in the country, Students from different countries across Asia participate in this tournament, making it one of the more noteworthy school-level football competitions.

History

Subroto Mukerjee conceived the idea in 1958 when he was the Chief of the Air Staff. Subroto Mukerjee Sports Education Society was formed in 1960 after his untimely death in Tokyo. The first tournament was held in 1960, with participation of about 50 school teams. The number of schools participating increased over the years. Since 1998, the tournament is played in two age groups, sub-Junior (under 14 years) and Junior (under 17 years). Madhyamgram High School from West Bengal has won the U-17 tournament seven times in total, which includes a hat trick of titles in the year 1981, 1982 and 1983.

Organisation
Subroto Cup is conducted by the Indian Air Force, with the help of Ministry of Youth Affairs & Sports. Initially it was organized by the Durand football tournament committee but in 1994, the Air Force Sports Control Board took over the Subroto Cup tournament and has been conducting it since then.

The preliminary inter-school tournaments are held in every state of India starting from sub-division, district and division level culminating in the inter-school finals at the state level. The school teams, winning the state inter-school championships are then invited to participate in the main Subroto Cup Tournament at Delhi.

The tournament is held on a league cum knock out basis system and is played in accordance with laws and rules relating as framed by FIFA and as adopted by the All India Football Federation (AIFF) and the Services Sports Control Board. The duration of the game in the league matches is 30 minutes each half with an interval of 10 minutes. In the event of a draw in the knock-out matches, extra time of 7 minutes each half with one minute's interval is allowed. If a match ends in a draw even after extra time, the game is decided by enforcing the penalty shootout rule.

Tournament structure
The current tournament structure consists of the preliminary inter-school tournaments at different divisional levels culminating in the inter-school finals at the state level. The winners then participate in the main national tournament.

Venues
The venues for the tournament held at New Delhi:
Ambedkar Stadium
Jawaharlal Nehru Stadium
Tejas Football Ground (Race Course)
Subroto Park

International Participation 
School teams from numerous countries have played in the tournament, with the first team reaching the final in 1993 being the Special Sports School from Uzbekistan. Since then many schools from foreign countries take part regularly, such as Brazil, Indonesia, Afghanistan, Nepal, Ukraine, Sri Lanka, Bangladesh, Bhutan etc.

In the 2015 Championship, for the first time teams of boys and girls came from Afghanistan for the tournament. Brazilian legend and football's elder statesman Pele came to India after a gap of 38 years to attend the final of the 56th edition of the Subroto Cup as the chief guest. In 2016, Rivaldo and Roberto Carlos were the chief guests at the 57th edition.

Sponsorship
All India Radio
Canara Bank
Central Bank of India
Cosco
Enerzal
LIC
Ministry of Youth Affairs and Sports
SAI
SBI

Results

Junior (U–17) football tournament
The following is the list of winners and runners-up:

Sub–Junior (U–14) football tournament
At the request of the School Games Federation of India, the Subroto Cup organisers started a sub-junior (11-14 Years) football tournament
from 1998. Sixteens teams participated in the inaugural tournament, while more schools took part in the following years. Since 2000, the fairplay trophy for the sub-junior group has been named in the memory of late Lieutenant Sandeep Loomba, who died in a mountaineering expedition at Abi Gamin peak. Fairplay trophy for the junior group, medals and certificates for both the age groups, are provided by the Subroto Society

Girls Junior (U–17) football tournament

References

External links
 Official website
 

Football cup competitions in India
Youth football competitions
Youth football in India
1960 establishments in India
Recurring sporting events established in 1960
History of the Indian Air Force